Moj mikro was a monthly Slovene-language computer magazine published in Slovenia. It was in circulation between 1984 and 2015. Moj mikro was one of the most popular IT magazines in Yugoslavia during the 80's, spanning a large variety of technology topics and was published in Slovenian and Serbo-Croatian (until 1991).

Profile
Moj mikro was established in 1984. The founding editor was Žiga Turk. Delo Revije, d. d. was the publisher. The magazine was published monthly. It targeted men between 14 and 64 years of age.

In 2008 the magazine had a circulation of 10,000 copies.

See also
 List of magazines in Slovenia

References

External links
Official website (defunct)
Farewell message (in Slovenian)
Scanned old magazine issues

1984 establishments in Slovenia
2015 disestablishments in Slovenia
Computer magazines published in Slovenia
Defunct computer magazines
Defunct magazines published in Slovenia
Magazines established in 1984
Magazines disestablished in 2015
Magazines published in Yugoslavia
Mass media in Ljubljana
Monthly magazines
Slovene-language magazines